Toledo do Brasil is a Brazilian company that manufactures and resells weighing equipment as well as cold cut slicers and electronic labels, headquartered in São Bernardo do Campo. It was founded in 1956 as a subsidiary of the Toledo Scale Company (today Mettler Toledo) and subsequently nationalised in 1988.

History 
In 1932, the Toledo Scale Company created a representative office in Brazil. 1956, this was expanded with the purchase of a small factory to form Toledo do Brasil Indústria de Balanças Ltda. In 1988, the company was bought over by Brazilian businessmen.

Business 
The company sells weighing equipment, as well as cold cut slicers and electronic labels.

Some of its products are manufactured, while others are resold from other brands including ABM, Cargoscan, Datalogic, Mettler-Toledo, Measurement Systems International, Pricer, Wipotec, and Railweight.

Bibliography

External links 
 

Industry in Brazil
Companies based in São Paulo (state)
São Bernardo do Campo